The following television stations in the United States brand as channel 16 (though neither using virtual channel 16 nor broadcasting on physical RF channel 16):
 KOSA-DT2 in Odessa, Texas
 WBXH-CD in Baton Rouge, Louisiana

16 branded